Królowy Most  is a village in the administrative district of Gmina Gródek, within Białystok County, Podlaskie Voivodeship, in north-eastern Poland, close to the border with Belarus.

The village has a population of 90.

It is the death place of German commander Henning von Tresckow, who committed suicide there after the failed 20 July plot against Hitler.

References

Further reading

Villages in Białystok County